Dmytro Valeriyovych Nazarenko (also Deniz Nazar, ; born August 19, 1980) is a Ukrainian-born Turkish former swimmer, who specialized in individual medley events. He is a fifth-place finalist in the 400 m individual medley at the 2002 European Short Course Swimming Championships in Riesa, Germany (4:12.07).

Nazar made his first Ukrainian team at the 2000 Summer Olympics in Sydney. Swimming in heat three of the men's 400 m individual medley, he edged out Slovenia's Marko Milenkovič to take a fifth seed and twenty-eighth overall by a 1.36-second margin in 4:25.26.

At the 2004 Summer Olympics in Athens, Nazar placed twenty-sixth overall in the 400 m individual medley. Swimming in heat four on the morning prelims, Nazar saved a seventh spot and twenty-sixth overall against China's  Liu Weijia, who finished behind him by less than 0.13 of a second, with a time of 4:26.15.

Eight years later, Nazar had approved a nationality transfer by FINA to compete for the Turkish team at the 2008 Summer Olympics in Beijing, under a new name Deniz Nazar. He achieved a FINA B-standard entry time of 4:26.64 from the Croatian Open Championships in Dubrovnik. For his third time in the 400 m individual medley, Nazar challenged five other swimmers in heat one, including two-time Olympians Vasilii Danilov of Kyrgyzstan and Hocine Haciane of Andorra. He touched out Haciane to take a fourth spot by a 1.20-second margin with a time of 4:30.80. Nazar failed to qualify for the final, as he placed twenty-eighth overall on the first night of preliminaries.

References

External links
NBC Olympics Profile
Profile – Swim Ukraine 

1980 births
Living people
Turkish male medley swimmers
Ukrainian male medley swimmers
Olympic swimmers of Turkey
Olympic swimmers of Ukraine
Swimmers at the 2000 Summer Olympics
Swimmers at the 2004 Summer Olympics
Swimmers at the 2008 Summer Olympics
Fenerbahçe swimmers
Sportspeople from Rivne
Ukrainian emigrants to Turkey
Turkish people of Ukrainian descent